Mario Minai (born 6 July 1912, date of death unknown) was a Hungarian sprinter. He competed in the men's 200 metres at the 1936 Summer Olympics.

References

1912 births
Year of death missing
Athletes (track and field) at the 1936 Summer Olympics
Hungarian male sprinters
Olympic athletes of Hungary
Place of birth missing